Murray W. Enkin (May 29, 1924 – June 6, 2021) was a Canadian physician and writer. He was born in Toronto, Ontario, and studied medicine at the University of Toronto and later specialized as an obstetrician and gynaecologist at Long Island College Hospital in Brooklyn. He was a professor, philosopher, activist, public speaker and author, who contributed to the fields of maternal care and childbirth, and evidence-based medicine.

Career and impact 
In 2012 Enkin was awarded the Order of Canada for "his contributions to maternal care and the development of midwifery as a recognized profession in Canada." CBC reported at that time that "he lived and worked in Hamilton for nearly 60 years where his practices and research into family-centred maternal care grew to become the norm across the country." He became a faculty member at McMaster University's School of Medicine not long after its founding.

He was an early supporter of midwifery as a profession, contributing "to midwives becoming accepted members of the health care system in Ontario and to setting a tone of collaboration and respect between midwives and other health care professions." In 1982, he was an expert witness in a court case which led to the establishment of midwifery as a profession in Canada. During his time in Hamilton, he is also credited by Lynn Johnston with inspiring her career as a cartoonist.

He has been a member of the editorial board for the journal Birth since the publication's founding in 1973. Enkin co-authored Effective Care in Pregnancy and Childbirth (1989), which, according to a review in Science, "moved obstetrics from the rear to the forefront of scientifically based clinical disciplines", and provided the basis for The Cochrane Collaboration.

Murray Enkin died on June 6, 2021.

Books 
Enkin, Murray; Iain Chalmers (1982). Effectiveness and Satisfaction in Antenatal Care. MacKeith Press. .

Chalmers, Iain; Murray Enkin; Marc J.N.C. Keirse (1989). Effective Care in Pregnancy and Childbirth. Oxford University Press. .

Enkin, Murray; Marc J.N.C. Keirse; James Neilson; Caroline Crowther; Lelia Duley; Ellen Hodnett; Justus Hofmeyer (third edition 2000). A Guide to Effective Care in Pregnancy and Childbirth. Oxford University Press. .

Jadad, Alejandro R.; Murray Enkin (second edition 2007). Randomized controlled trials: Question, answers, and musings. Malden, Massachusetts: Blackwell Publishing. .

Enkin, Murray (2021). Musings: Time, Place, and Beyond.

References

External links 
The Murray Enkin Biography Project
Murray Enkin on Google Scholar
Murray Enkin Obituary in the Globe and Mail

1924 births
2021 deaths
Members of the Order of Canada
Canadian obstetricians
Academic staff of McMaster University
Writers from Toronto
20th-century Canadian physicians
21st-century Canadian physicians
20th-century Canadian male writers
21st-century Canadian male writers
20th-century Canadian non-fiction writers
21st-century Canadian non-fiction writers